Paloma is a Mexican telenovela produced by Alfredo Saldaña and Ernesto Alonso for Televisión Independiente de México in 1975.

Cast
Ofelia Medina as Paloma
Antonio Passy as Sarabia
Rita Macedo as Teresa
Andrés García as Daniel
Aarón Hernán as Gustavo
July Furlong as Isabel
Tere Velázquez as Eugenia
Frank Moro as Raul
Carmen Montejo as Gloria
Héctor Bonilla as Alejandro
Enrique Novi as Gabriel
Anel as Margo
Juan Pelaez as Eladio
Lina Michel as Michel
Lucía Méndez as Rosa
Lupita D'Alessi as Dora Luz
Bertha Moss as Catalina
Ariadne Welter as Mina Ballesteros
Oscar Morelli as Lic. Gil

References

External links

Mexican telenovelas
1975 telenovelas
Televisa telenovelas
Spanish-language telenovelas
1975 Mexican television series debuts
1975 Mexican television series endings